This article lists notable achievements of women, ethnic minorities, people with disabilities, and LGBT people in Serbian politics.

Women 

 Ana Brnabić, first female Prime Minister of Serbia

LGBT 

 Ana Brnabić, first lesbian Prime Minister of Serbia

References 

Elections in Serbia
Serbia
Serbia politics-related lists